Constant Huysmans (11 October 1928 – 16 May 2016) was a Belgian former international footballer who played as a defender.

Career
Born in Antwerp, Huysmans played club football for Beerschot VAC.

He earned a total of 22 caps for Belgium between 1953 and 1959, and participated at the 1954 FIFA World Cup.

References

External links
 

1928 births
2016 deaths
Belgian footballers
Belgium international footballers
1954 FIFA World Cup players
Footballers from Antwerp
Association football defenders